Werner van den Steen de Jehay (11 July 1854, Ghent – 1 October 1934, Rome) was a Belgian diplomat. He was of noble birth, and had missions in Belgrade and Rome. He was ambassador of Belgium to Italy from 1919 to 1924.

Family 
Werner van de Steen is the son of Louis van den Steen de Jehay (1812-1864) and Alix Mélanie Célestine (v. 1828–1859), countess of Gourcy Serainchamps.

He married Marguerite Julien (1868-1951), and together they had two children.

 Herbert (1896-1958). Married Jeanne Gabrielle Bertha Hoepfner (1900-1978) April 30, 1931 in Paris, 19th arrondissement[1].
 Serge (born 1923). x1 Claude Ruffin (born 1931) April 23, 1957 ; x2 Annie Bonivert ; x3 (November 7, 1964) Josette Weerts (born 1928)
 Béatrice (born 1930). Married Frédéric Sépulchre (Jupille-sur-Meuse, August 10, 1929 - Woluwe-Saint-Pierre, February 29, 2016[2]) June 12, 1952. Produced six children[3].
 Jérôme Herman Ernest Gaëtan vdS (born in Paris, 10th arrondissement, August 15. 1933 - 2014). x1 (November 30, 1957 in Méan ; religious marriage in Bruxelles on December 20, 1957) Marie-Antoinette Louise Jeanne Ghislaine Josèphe du Bois de Bounam de Ryckholt (born January 31, 1937, Etterbeek) ; x2 Marie-Jeanne Lemonde-Vanden Bruel.
 Guy vdS de Jehay (1906-1999).

Works 

 Rapport sur la production et le commerce des lins dans la Grande Bretagne et en Irlande, Impr. des travaux publics, 1893.
 Rapport sur les conditions de l'agriculture dans le Royaume-Uni, Impr. des travaux publics, 1893.

Honours 
 1922: Knight Grand Cross in the Order of Leopold II.

References

1854 births
1934 deaths
Ambassadors of Belgium to Italy
People from Ghent
Recipients of the Grand Cross of the Order of Leopold II